Lambert the Sheepish Lion is a Disney animated short film that was released in 1952. It was directed by Jack Hannah.

Plot 
A stork (the same stork from Dumbo) delivers a flock of newborn lambs to their expectant mothers, but finds that he had mistakenly brought along a lion named Lambert (apparently misinterpreting its name), which was supposed to go to South Africa; one of the mother sheep, who was heartbroken at not receiving a lamb, forcefully demands the stork leave Lambert with her.

Lambert lives his life thinking he is a sheep, but is ostracized by his peers for being and acting different; he is also defenseless against the other lambs' head-butts. One night, a hungry wolf (the same wolf from the "Peter and the Wolf" segment from Make Mine Music), attacks the flock. At first timid like the other sheep, Lambert's lion instincts kick in when the wolf corners Lambert's mother; with an aggressive roar, Lambert butts the wolf off a ledge.

Thereafter, the now-adult Lambert is wholeheartedly accepted by the other sheep as one of the flock and the narrator tells us to not worry about that wolf, which hangs precariously from a bush—the berries on the bush will sustain him.

Cast 
The voice of the narrator and the stork was provided by actor and Disney legend Sterling Holloway. Holloway also was the voice for the stork in Dumbo, in which the character plays a very similar role in the plot. Uncredited roles include June Foray, who made the sounds of the sheep, Lambert's sheep mother and Lambert's purrs and growls, and Stan Freberg, who voiced Lambert's only spoken line, "Mama!"

Reception 
In 1952, the film was nominated for an Academy Award in the category Best Short Subject, Cartoons but lost to The Two Mouseketeers, a Tom and Jerry cartoon which shared one of 7 Oscars for the Tom and Jerry series. A picture book adaptation for children was also released in the 1970s as part of the "Disney's Wonderful World of Reading" series.

The original print of the film was given as a gift to Emperor Hirohito of Japan because it was his favorite Disney cartoon.

Other releases 
It also aired as a prelude to Disney's The Lion King when originally released on the big screen in some countries. In the late 1980s it was seen on NBC television as a prelude to the network's prime-time airing of Dumbo, likely because of the presence of the stork character in both films.

Home media 
The short was released on December 6, 2005, on Walt Disney Treasures: Disney Rarities - Celebrated Shorts: 1920s–1960s.

Additional releases include:
Limited Gold Edition: Disney's Best - The Fabulous 50's in 1984
Walt Disney Mini Classics video release of Willie the Operatic Whale in 1991
25th anniversary DVD release of The Fox and the Hound in 2006
Gold Classic Collection DVD release of Melody Time in 2000

References

External links 
 
 

1952 short films
1952 animated films
1950s Disney animated short films
Animated films about lions
Animated films about wolves
Animated films about orphans
Films about sheep
Films set in South Africa
Films directed by Jack Hannah
Films produced by Walt Disney
Films about bullying
Films scored by Joseph Dubin
1950s English-language films
American animated short films
RKO Pictures short films
RKO Pictures animated short films